Linyi County is a county in the northwest of Shandong province, People's Republic of China. It is administered by the prefecture-level city of Dezhou.

The population was 509,846 in 1999.

Administrative divisions
As 2012, this County is divided to 3 subdistricts, 8 towns and 1 township.
Subdistricts
Xingdong Subdistrict
Hengyuan Subdistrict
Liupan Subdistrict

Towns

Townships
Su'an Township

Climate

References

External links
 Information page

Linyi
Dezhou